Barit (historically Bari) is a small, wooded, privately owned island in northern Cagayan, Philippines. It is under the jurisdiction of Barangay Fuga Island in the municipality of Aparri.

Location and geography 
Barit Island is north of Luzon Island in the Luzon Strait. Mabag Island is only  from Barit. There is a small airstrip on Barit. Barit was owned by Chinese-Filipino businessman Tan Yu, who purchased the island in 1990. Barit is currently administered by Barit Island Holdings, a subsidiary of Yu's Asiaworld Internationale.

See also 
 List of islands in the Philippines

References 

Islands of Iloilo
Private islands of the Philippines